Edmund Turnor may refer to:

 Edmund Turnor (Lincolnshire MP) (1838–1903), English Conservative Party politician
 Edmund Turnor (antiquarian) (1755–1829), English antiquarian, author, landowner and politician